Samuel González Martínez (born 17 February 1997), known as Samu Manchón, is a Spanish professional footballer who plays for UD Montijo. Mainly an attacking midfielder, he can also play as a winger or a right back.

Club career
Born in Almendralejo, Extremadura, Manchón joined Real Betis' youth setup in March 2013, from CP Almendralejo. On 23 June 2016, he signed for Extremadura UD and was initially assigned to the reserves in Tercera División.

On 19 November 2017, Manchón made his first-team debut by coming on as a second-half substitute for Jairo Izquierdo in a 0–1 Segunda División B home loss against Real Murcia. He made his professional debut the following 19 August, starting in a 1–1 away draw against Real Oviedo.

On 19 September 2020, free agent Manchón signed for UD Montijo in the fourth division.

References

External links

1997 births
Living people
People from Almendralejo
Spanish footballers
Footballers from Extremadura
Association football midfielders
Segunda División players
Segunda División B players
Segunda Federación players
Tercera División players
Extremadura UD B players
Extremadura UD footballers